(English: The German Canadian; originally , English: The German Canadian and News Messenger) was a German-language weekly newspaper published in Berlin, Canada West (now Kitchener, Ontario), from 1841 to 1865. The  was founded in January 1841 by Heinrich "Henry" Eby, son of Berlin's founder Benjamin Eby. It was among Upper Canada's first German-language newspapers and was the only one published in British North America from September 1841 through January 1848, during which time it was widely read across Canada.

In the 1840s, Canada West experienced an influx of German immigrants who left Europe due to social and political upheaval. The  directed its coverage towards the interests of these new immigrants, focusing on European politics and social happenings, especially those of Germany. Regarding Canadian politics, the newspaper was a reliable supporter of the Reform Party. As most new immigrants were artisans rather than farmers, readers demanded German prose and poetry, and the newspaper supplemented its political coverage with literary content.

Across its twenty-four year history, the newspaper went through numerous owners and editors. The instability which characterized its management left it unable to easily cope with competition. In 1859, the head of the s mechanical department, abruptly left the newspaper to found the competing Berliner Journal. The  folded in January 1865, with attempted revivals in the late 1860s failing quickly.

Background 

At the beginning of the nineteenth century, Waterloo Township in Upper Canada was primarily made up of Mennonites from Pennsylvania. With an influx of European immigrants to Upper Canada beginning in the 1820s, the presence of this German-speaking population attracted German settlers. As the third-largest immigrant group to Canada in the nineteenth century after the English and French, German publications were in high demand. The publications faced numerous obstacles to their success, including a short supply of German printers and typesetters. As well, most news items needed to be translated into German from English, a labour-intensive process, especially when dealing with more technical subjects.

Canada Museum und Allgemeine Zeitung  

In 1835, Heinrich Wilhelm Peterson established  in the hamlet of Berlin, Waterloo Township. As Upper Canada's first German-language weekly newspaper, the publication predated Berlin's first English newspaper by 18 years. Born in Quakenbrück, Duchy of Oldenburg, on 27 May 1793, Peterson's parents migrated to Baltimore, Maryland when he was two years old. Arriving in Harrisburg, Pennsylvania, in March 1803, he operated several German publications in Pennsylvania in the 1810s and 1820s before moving to Berlin in 1832. Wanting to start another newspaper, but finding himself with little available capital, he relied on help from around 140 friends, 51 of whom became shareholders in the newspaper. His first apprentice, Heinrich Eby, the son of bishop and Berlin-founder Benjamin Eby, assisted in the production, printing a poem by the German poet Christian Friedrich Daniel Schubart.

The newspaper ran pieces advocating for Berlin to be the township's "district town", while subscribers hoped it would help to preserve their language and traditional values. He sold the German part of his printing business to Heinrich Eby, who had by that time been apprenticing under Peterson as a printer for four years. The final issue of the  ran on 18 December 1840, with Peterson recommending Eby and Enslin's new German language newspaper, to all  subscribers.

History 

Heinrich Eby founded  (The German Canadian and News Messenger) in January 1841, serving as its first publisher and owner. Basing the newspaper in Berlin, Eby built a printing office near the corner of King and South Eby Streets. Christian Enslin was the s first editor, holding the position for nine years. A local bookbinder and seller of books, medicines and glasses, Enslin migrated from Württemberg to Berlin in 1833. The  went through a series of editors, some only serving for a few months. At the end of 1851, Eby sold the newspaper to his brother, Peter Eby, and in July 1856 Peter sold it to another brother, Elias Eby. Elias served a broader audience through publishing an English language newspaper as well, the Berlin Telegraph and Waterloo County Intelligencer, from 1853 to 1899.

With frequent changes in ownership and many different editors, the paper experienced consistent instability in its management, with disputes between publisher and editor common. The most significant shock to the  came when the head of its mechanical department, left in 1859 to found the competing Berliner Journal with John Motz. Entering into a prolonged feud with the Journal, the management of the  found it too difficult to cope against the better run Journal.

The attempt lasted less than two years, dissolving in October 1869.

Content

Format and style 

As a weekly newspaper, subscribers paid CA$2.00 per year or CA$3.00 if receiving it by mail (equivalent to CA$ and CA$ in ) until 1852, at which time the prices were reduced to $1.50 in advance or $2.00 if in arrears three months (equivalent to CA$ and CA$ in ). Always four pages long, the dimensions of the newsprint expanded over time. Beginning with 20 × 14 inch paper (50.8 × 35.6 cm) and four large columns per page, the dimensions expanded to 22 × 16 inches (55.9 × 40.6 cm) for 1843–1844 before reverting to its original size; in 1848, it again expanded to its larger size, adding a fifth column to each page; in 1852, it added a sixth column. In 1853, it again increased, this time to 25½ × 19½ inches (64.8 × 49.5 cm) and seven columns per page.

In its written vocabulary, the newspaper occasionally used words from the local Pennsylvania German language, including "" (flour) and "" (clergy), amongst others. Advertisements were mostly in German, but English ones appeared on occasion. Scholar Herbert Karl Kalbfleisch writes the newspaper was stylistically weak, which "offended the taste of some readers", though most did not complain.

Coverage 

In the 1840s, Canada West experienced another influx of German immigrants caused by poor agricultural conditions in Europe, as well as turbulent political conditions resulting from the German revolutions of 1848–1849. From September 1841 through January 1848,  was the only German language newspaper in British North America. The only circulation figure available is from the 2 January 1852 issue of the newspaper, with Peter Eby writing that the subscription list numbered almost one thousand. Kalbfleisch writes there is no way to confirm the figure, adding that some newspapers artificially inflated their subscriber numbers to attract advertisers.

Though his father was a Mennonite, Heinrich Eby instead focused the paper towards the German culture of Berlin's new immigrants, cultivating a unique German-Canadian culture. Though the new immigrants detested the German political system they left behind, they remained interested in the political and social events of Germany, leading the newspaper to focus on European coverage. The  published an extra edition in March 1848 covering the revolutions in Europe, which Kalbfleisch suggests indicates how interested the readership remained in European news.

Despite its focus on Europe, the  covered Canadian political content, especially regarding its political and public institutions. Kalbfleisch suggests the coverage of Canadian politics was framed in a way to encourage recent German immigrants to abandon "their lethargy toward public affairs which had characterized the behavior of many of them in the fatherland". While the  attempted to be politically impartial, it strongly denounced the rebellions of 1837–1838. The , however, was consistently partisan through all of its owners and editors, vehemently arguing for the Reform Party and describing the Tories as dishonest and corrupt. The paper encouraged those Germans who could vote to support the Reform Party in all election contests. Through the 1850s, McDougall's political connections helped him win the majority of Waterloo County's municipal printing contracts. When the Liberal Party gifted him a gold watch in 1861 to recognize his services, the Berliner Journal criticized the gift as open bribery. In December 1863, McDougall was proposed to be the county registrar of deeds, with the Journal strongly opposing the nomination and suggesting the "honest man" A. J. Peterson in his place. Despite the opposition, McDougall won the position in 1864.

As recent German immigrants were mostly made up of artisans rather than farmers, the readers of the  demanded poetry and prose content, pushing the paper to maintain "a high literary tone". After Edward Lindemann became editor in October 1853, the amount of literary content greatly expanded, including several of Lindemann's short stories. Kalbfleisch writes that Lindemann "raised the quality of the  appreciably and improved its literary tone". After publishing a serial story from January through February 1854 – "" by Friedrich Gerstäcker – the newspaper published at least one prose story instalment with each issue until it folded in January 1865.

See also 
List of German language newspapers of Ontario
List of early Canadian newspapers
List of defunct newspapers of Canada

Notes

References

Citations

Sources

Further reading

External links 

 
 Newspapers on Microfilm at the Kitchener Public Library
 Der Deutsche Canadier 1856–1864 copies (in German) digitized on the Canadian Research Knowledge Network
 Der Deutsche Canadier und Neuigkeitsbote entry on the University of Alberta's Canadian Minority Media Database

German-language newspapers published in Berlin/Kitchener
Newspapers established in 1841
Defunct newspapers published in Ontario
Defunct weekly newspapers
Publications disestablished in 1865
1841 establishments in Ontario
1865 disestablishments in Ontario